Trial of Champions is the second EP by Canadian power metal band 3 Inches of Blood. It was released in digital download format on October 17, 2007 by Roadrunner Records. The title track was inspired by the Fighting Fantasy game book of the same name, and features a similar plot in which an enslaved gladiator fights his way to victory, and ultimately kills the emperor. "In the Time of Job When Mammon Was a Yippie" is a cover of a song by progressive rock band Lucifer's Friend, from their debut album. "Key to Oblivion" is a B-side from the band's previous studio album, Fire Up the Blades.

It is the last release by the band to include their screamer, Jamie Hooper.

Track listing

Personnel
 Cam Pipes – clean vocals
 Jamie Hooper – screamed vocals
 Justin Hagberg – lead guitar
 Shane Clark – rhythm guitar
 Nick Cates – bass
 Alexei Rodriguez – drums
 Joey Jordison – producer

2007 EPs
3 Inches of Blood albums
Roadrunner Records EPs